Eh Phuthong  (born 1975), also spelled Ei Phouthang, is a retired Cambodian professional kickboxer and former reality TV host of Khmer and Chinese descent. Born in Mondol Seima district, Koh Kong province, Cambodia, Eh Phuthong currently lives in Phnom Penh. He has a father name Yem Lim and a mother named At Uth. He also has a brother and a sister.

Eh Phuthong began learning Kun Khmer, traditional Khmer kickboxing at age twelve with Mr. Yuth Phuthong in the 1980s, who then held the position of Prey Veng provincial governor and now, Koh Kong Province governor. Eh Phuthong had his first Khmer traditional kickboxing contest at the age of 17.  He initially began fighting at the 48 kg weight class and then moved to the 63 kg weight class. Then he moved up to the weight class of 82 kg. Growing up he did not have access to education because he was either working jobs to support his family or training in his passion of Khmer kickboxing. He has also trained with Chhit Sarim at the Ministry of Defense Boxing Club. Eh Phuthong now owns his own gym and boxing club, Eh Phuthorng Tonle Bassac Club. Among his boxers is his younger brother, Auth Phuthong.

In recent years, Eh Phuthong has explored media opportunities outside the ring. He has starred in two Khmer-language action films and was the co-host of CTN's highly rated reality show, Kun Khmer Champion.  Finalist, Ai Kosal, is a boxer from 7NG, Eh Phuthong Boxing Club.

He is also capable of speaking Thai as well as Khmer.  He reached the semifinal in the first S1 championship in Thailand defeating X Rafi from  Spain and losing in the 2nd round up to the eventual tournament champion Suriya Ploenchit.  He has expressed an interest in wanting to fight John Wayne Parr.  He recently won a bronze medal in western boxing at the 2009 Southeast Asian Games in Laos.

Kickboxing Record

See also 
List of male kickboxers

References

External links
Cambodian Town interview
 S1 results

Videos
Dailymotion: Eh Phuthong vs. Antea Atomea
youtube: Kun Khmer Champion

1975 births
Cambodian male kickboxers
Cambodian people of Chinese descent
People from Koh Kong province
Living people
Southeast Asian Games medalists in boxing
Southeast Asian Games bronze medalists for Cambodia
Competitors at the 2009 Southeast Asian Games